Karlsruher SC is a German association football club, based in Karlsruhe, Baden-Württemberg that currently plays in the 2. Bundesliga, the second tier of German football. Domestically, the club was crowned German champion in 1909, and won the DFB-Pokal in 1955 and 1956. In Europe, KSC won the UEFA Intertoto Cup in 1996, which remains the club's last major honor.

Formed as Karlsruher Fussball Club Phönix in 1894, the modern form of the club was formed as the result of several mergers in 1952, and its early success granted KSC a spot in the inaugural Bundesliga season in 1963. KSC spent the next few decades as a yo-yo club frequently being promoted and relegated between the top two divisions, with their best Bundesliga season coming in 1996 when KSC finished 6th in the table. Relegation followed in 1998, and the club has since spent all but two seasons between the second and third tiers. KSC maintains a fierce rivalry with VfB Stuttgart, a game in which old Badenese-Württembergian animosities are played out.

History

A succession of mergers
The most successful of these ancestral clubs was Karlsruher Fussball Club Phönix, formed on 6 June 1894 by dissatisfied members of the gymnastics club Karlsruher Turngemeinde. They quickly became a strong regional side, playing in the Südkreis-Liga, and captured the national title in 1909, defeating defending champions Viktoria 89 Berlin 4–2 in the championship final that season. In 1912, Phönix merged with KFC Alemannia, established in 1897, to create KFC Phönix (Phönix Alemannia).

 It was as Phönix Karlsruhe that the club joined the Gauliga Baden, one of 16 top-flight divisions created in the re-organization of German football under the Third Reich. They slipped from the first division for a single season in 1936, but returned to compete as a mediocre side over the next several years. In the 1943–44 season, Karlsruhe played with Germania Durlach as the combined wartime side named KSG (Kriegssportgemeinschaft) Phönix/Germania Karlsruhe. After World War II in 1946, Phönix re-emerged to compete in the newly formed first division Oberliga Süd, finishing 15th in their first season there. The club was relegated the following season.

Two other threads in the evolution of KSC were the formation of FC Mühlburg in 1905 out of 1. FV Sport Mühlburg (founded in 1890) and Viktoria Mühlburg (founded in 1892), and the merger of FC Germania (founded in 1898) and FC Weststadt (founded in 1902) to form VfB Karlsruhe in 1911. FC Mühlburg and VfB Karlsruhe would in turn merge to form VfB Mühlburg in 1933. The group of clubs which came together to form VfB Mühlburg were an undistinguished lot, sharing just one season of upper-league play between them. The new side, however, started to compete in the first-division Gauliga Baden immediately after the league was established in 1933.

A lower-table side through the 1930s, VfB's performance improved considerably in the following decade. As war overtook the country, the Gauliga Baden was sub-divided at various times into a number of more local city-based circuits and the team was able to earn three-second-place finishes in divisional play. The Gauliga Baden collapsed in 1944–45 after playing a significantly reduced schedule in which many teams, including Mühlburg were unable to compete. After the war the club slipped from top-flight competition until earning promotion to the Oberliga Süd in 1947. They generally competed as a mid-table side here with the exception of a strong performance in 1951 when they narrowly missed an advance to the national championship rounds after earning a third-place result just a single point behind SpVgg Fürth.

The formation of Karlsruher SC
KFC Phoenix and VfB Mühlburg united to form the Karlsruher Sport-Club Mühlburg-Phönix e. V., on 16 October 1952 and the new team earned good results throughout the remainder of the decade. In 1955, they beat Schalke 04 3–2 to win the DFB-Pokal, and repeated the success next year with a 3–1 win over Hamburger SV. That season, they also made an appearance in the national final, where they lost 2–4 to Borussia Dortmund. KSC was Oberliga Süd champion in 1956, 1958 and 1960, as well as runner-up in the DFB-Pkal in 1960, when they lost the final match 2–3 to Borussia Mönchengladbach. Their record earned them admission as one of sixteen founding clubs into Germany's new professional football league, the Bundesliga, when it began play in 1963.

Karlsruhe struggled in the top flight, never managing better than a 13th-place finish over five seasons before finally being demoted to the second-division Regionalliga Süd. Over the next three seasons, the team earned a first-place finish as well as two-second-place finishes there, but were unable to advance in the promotion rounds. After the 1974 formation of the 2. Bundesliga, which consisted of two divisions at the time, KSC finished first in the 2. Bundesliga Süd and returned to the top flight for the 1975–76 season, but were able to stay up for only two years. They next returned to the first division in 1980 where they spent four seasons before being sent down again. After a two-year absence they fought their way back to the Bundesliga in 1987 to begin an extended stay.

The Schäfer era
Under the guidance of new coach Winfried Schäfer, KSC's return to the top flight was marked with some success as for the first time the team managed to work its way out of the bottom half of the league table. In the 1993–94 season, the club had a successful run in the UEFA Cup, going out in the semi-finals on away goals to Austria Salzburg after beating, in turn, PSV, Valencia, Bordeaux and Boavista. Their stunning 7–0 second-round victory over Valencia, a top team in the Spanish La Liga at the time and in historical terms as well, might be considered the high point of the club's history in its centennial year. Edgar "Euro Eddy" Schmitt scored 4 goals and became a club legend. Between 1992 and 1997, the club was ranked in the single digits in six consecutive Bundesliga seasons and also participated in two more UEFA Cups, reaching the third round both in the 1996–97 and 1997–98 seasons, being eliminated from the competition after losing their second-leg matches to Brøndby and Spartak Moscow respectively. In 1995, KSC won the DFB-Hallenpokal, an indoor football tournament that was traditionally held during winter breaks of the Bundesliga seasons. They also played in the final of the DFB-Pokal in 1996, but lost 0–1 to 1. FC Kaiserslautern.

As the millennium drew to a close, Karlsruhe faded. The club started the 1997–98 Bundesliga season well, with two wins and a draw in their opening three matches, but their downfall began with a 1–6 defeat to Bayer Leverkusen on Day 4. At the league winter break the club sat outside the relegation ranks, but a series of negative results pushed them down to 15th place until the second-last matchday of the season. Schäfer was fired in March 1998, but this did not keep the club from slipping to the Second Bundesliga after a 16th-place finish. The club needed an away draw against Hansa Rostock on the final day of the season to avoid relegation, but lost the match 2–4 while Borussia Mönchengladbach beat VfL Wolfsburg 2–0 to overtake KSC and finish 15th on goal difference.

After relegation from the Bundesliga in 1998
KSC finished fifth in their first season in the 2. Bundesliga after relegation, only two points behind third-place SSV Ulm 1846 which was promoted to the Bundesliga. However, a last place finish in a terrible 1999–2000 season played under dire financial circumstances dropped them down to the Regionalliga Süd (III). The club rebounded and on the strength of a first-place result in the Regionalliga made a prompt return to second division play. After four seasons of mediocre play that saw KSC narrowly avoid being sent further down, the team turned in a much-improved performance and earned a sixth-place result in 2005–06.

From 2007
KSC secured the 2007 2. Bundesliga title with three games left in the season by way of a 1–0 victory over SpVgg Unterhaching on 29 April, combined with a draw by second-placed Hansa Rostock on 30 April. KSC maintained its dominance over the course of the season, playing 14 matches (nine wins, five draws) before suffering their first loss of the campaign at the hands of Erzgebirge Aue. They are the first team in the history of the single-division 2. Bundesliga to occupy the top spot throughout the whole season.

In their return season to the Bundesliga in 2007–08 they finished 11th, fading in the second half of the year after a strong start that saw them positioned in the qualifying places for European competition. The club continued to perform poorly in the 2008–09 season, ultimately finishing 17th and finding themselves relegated to the 2. Bundesliga once more. The club's two most recent campaigns there ended with 10th and 15th-place finishes. Karlsruhe finished second level as 16th and faced Jahn Regensburg with relegation play-offs. These teams draw with as 1–1 at Regensburg and as 2–2 at Karlsruhe. This meant Karlsruhe's relegation to third tier after 12 years according to away goal rule.

The club successfully bounced back in 2012–13 when it won a championship in the 3. Liga and earned promotion back to the 2. Bundesliga.

2014–15 would see the club come close to a return to the Bundesliga, a third-place finish would see them play a promotion play-off against Hamburg, and after a 1–1 draw in Hamburg in the first leg, KSC were seconds away from promotion, only for Hamburg to score an equaliser in the 90th minute to force extra time, where they would score a winning away goal late in the second half to secure their Bundesliga status for another season.

In 2019, Karlsruhe won 4–1 against Preußen Münster on matchday 31, therefore returning to the 2. Bundesliga after a hiatus of two years.

Reserve team

The Karlsruher SC II, historically also referred to as Karlsruher SC Amateure, is a successful side in its own right, playing for many years as high up as the Regionalliga Süd. At the end of the 2011–12 season, the team was forcefully relegated to the Oberliga because of the relegation of the first team to the 3. Liga as reserve teams of 3. Liga clubs are not permitted in the Regionalliga anymore from 2012. The team had suffered a similar fate in 2000, when the first team was relegated to the Regionalliga Süd and the reserve team therefore had to leave this league despite finishing above the relegation ranks.

Between 1991 and 2000, the team also won the North Baden Cup on four occasions, thereby qualifying for the first round of the DFB-Pokal on each occasion. Its greatest success in this competition was reaching the third round in 1996–97.

After many restrained years, in which the targeted promotion was clearly missed, the already greatly reduced second team was discontinued for financial reasons at the end of the 2017–18 Oberliga season. However, KSC reopened its second team as a fans' team for the 2019–20 season and entered the Kreisklasse C, the lowest level of league football in Karlsruhe and North Baden.

League timeline

Honours
The club's honours:

League
 German football championship
 Champions: 1909
 Runners-up: 1956
 Southern German championship
 Champions: 1909, 1955–56, 1957–58, 1959–60, 1974–75
 Südkreis-Liga (I)
 Champions: 1909
 Runners-up: 1910, 1912
 Bezirksliga Baden (I)
 Champions: 1933
 Runners-up: 1928, 1931
 Gauliga Baden
 Runners-up: 1935
 Oberliga Süd (I)
 Champions: 1955–56, 1957–58, 1959–60
 2. Bundesliga (II)
 Champions: 1983–84, 2006–07
 Runners-up: 1986–87
 2. Bundesliga South (II)
 Champions: 1974–75
 Runners-up: 1979–80
 Regionalliga Süd (II)
 Champions: 1968–69
 Runners-up: 1969–70, 1970–71, 1972–73
 Regionalliga Süd (III)
 Champions: 2000–01
 3. Liga (III)
 Champions: 2012–13
 Runners-up: 2018–19

Cup
 DFB-Pokal
 Winners: 1954–55, 1955–56
 Runners-up: 1959–60, 1995–96
 Baden Cup (Tiers III-V)
 Winners: 2012–13, 2017–18, 2018–19

International
UEFA Intertoto Cup
 Champions: 1996

Reserve team
 Oberliga Baden-Württemberg
 Champions: 1989–90, 1995–96, 2004–05
 Verbandsliga Nordbaden (IV-V)
 Champions: 1982–83, 1988–89, 1993–94
 Amateurliga Nordbaden (III)
 Champions: 1964–65
 North Baden Cup
 Winners: 1990–91, 1993–94, 1995–96, 1999–2000

 All pre-1952 titles listed here were won by Phönix Karlsruhe.

Players

Current squad

Out on loan

Reserve team squad

Coaching history
Coaches of the club since 1952:

Recent seasons
The recent season-by-season performance of the club:

Karlsruher SC

Karlsruher SC II

 With the introduction of the Regionalligas in 1994 and the 3. Liga in 2008 as the new third tier, below the 2. Bundesliga, all leagues below dropped one tier. In 2012, the number of Regionalligas was increased from three to five with all Regionalliga Süd clubs except the Bavarian ones entering the new Regionalliga Südwest.

Key

References

External links

Karlsruher SC at Weltfussball
Das deutsche Fußball-Archiv historical German domestic league tables 

 
Football clubs in Germany
Football clubs in Baden-Württemberg
Sport in Karlsruhe
Association football clubs established in 1894
1894 establishments in Germany
Articles which contain graphical timelines
UEFA Intertoto Cup winning clubs
Bundesliga clubs
2. Bundesliga clubs
3. Liga clubs